Worcester Festival Choral Society (WFCS) is an independent, SATB (soprano, alto, tenor, bass) choir of around 150 amateur singers that presents classical choral concerts at Worcester Cathedral, Worcester. The conductor is Samuel Hudson (Worcester Cathedral’s Director of Music) and the accompanist is Nicholas Freestone (Worcester Cathedral’s Assistant Director of Music). The Chairman is Ben Cooper. The President is The Lord Bishop of Worcester and Senior Vice President is The Dean of Worcester.

Choir 
Worcester Festival Choral Society was founded in 1861 and has performed classical choral music in the City of Worcester ever since. Initially staging its concerts in Worcester’s former Music Hall (later known as the Public Hall; now demolished),  most of the Society’s concerts since 1930 have taken place in Worcester Cathedral. To date the Society performed more than 350 concerts. It has also staged several choral premieres, been recorded, performed in other UK cities and hosted conductors such as  Sir Edward Elgar.

The Society’s current concert orchestra is the Meridian Sinfonia, which has played at WFCS concerts since 2013. Each concert is also supported by professional soloists.

Directors of Music

History
Worcester Festival Choral Society was first established in 1861. Its aims were to cultivate choral music, and to provide singers to the  Three Choirs Festival Chorus. These aims are still part of its objectives today. 

The Society had close links with composer Sir Edward Elgar in the 1890s. At that time Elgar, who lived in Worcester, was a musician and not yet famous for composing music. Worcester Festival Choral Society had its own informal orchestral Band, and in the 1890s violinist Elgar became its leader. Several other musician members of his family also played in the WFCS Band.  As Elgar’s reputation grew, WFCS performed several of his choral works at its concerts, conducted by the composer. Elgar also wrote two choral works that were given their world premiere by Worcester Festival Choral Society, which he also conducted: The Black Knight (1892) and Scenes from the Bavarian Highlands (1895)  [3]. Two WFCS conductors of that era were also close friends of Edward Elgar,  and have music dedicated to them: his cantata  The Black Knight was dedicated to Hugh Blair; and the Third Pomp and Circumstance March (1904) was dedicated to Ivor Atkins. [4][5]. Other composers and conductors to have guest-conducted Worcester Festival Choral Society concerts over its history include Hubert Parry, Samuel Coleridge-Taylor, Walford Davies, Charles Villiers Stanford, Vernon Handley, Jonathan Willcocks and Sir Adrian Boult. 

Today, Worcester Festival Choral Society presents choral works written for SATB chorus, orchestra and soloists. Amongst the more traditional works performed are requiems, masses and oratorios by composers such as Mozart, Bach, Verdi, Haydn, Handel and Brahms. The choir also performs many late 19th/early 20th century choral pieces by composers such as Elgar, Vaughan Williams, Poulenc, Fauré and Britten; and later works by living composers including Lauridsen, Jonathan Willcocks and Jonathan Dove.

In addition to its own concerts, Worcester Festival Choral Society’s appearances around the UK have included the King's Lynn festival and two Elgar Festivals at the Royal Albert Hall in the 1970s; Elgar concerts at Birmingham’s Symphony Hall with the BBC Singers and Chorus in the early 1990s; and a performance of Britten's War Requiem at  Symphony Hall with the CBSO and City of Birmingham Chorus in 2004. Many of its singers also took part in a Three Choirs Festival 300th anniversary performance that was given to The Prince of Wales at Buckingham Palace in 2015. The following year, one of WFCS’s past Directors of Music, Sir David Willcocks, died. As a tribute, Worcester Festival Choral Society joined Worcester Cathedral Choir to create a music CD featuring many of the Christmas carol arrangements for which David Willcocks was famous, and it briefly entered the UK’s classical music charts. 

The Society has commissioned two pieces from its conductors: A Song of Celebration composed by Dr Donald Hunt in 1995 (marking English Music Year); and Creation Canticles, by Adrian Lucas, in 2004. 

For its 150th season in 2011, the Worcester Festival Choral Society performed Belshazzar’s Feast by Walton held a black tie dinner in Worcester’s Guildhall, which the four living Directors of Music (Sir David Willcocks, Dr Christopher Robinson,  Dr Donald Hunt and Adrian Lucas) attended.

Performances

Premieres

Music conducted or attended by the composer

Other event-related performances

References

Further reading
Allen, Kevin. Hugh Blair: Worcester’s Forgotten Organist, (2019, self-published). ISBN 978-0-9531227-7-6
Boden, Anthony; Hedley, Paul (2017). The Three Choirs Festival: A History. Boydell & Brewer. ISBN 978-1783272099
Parsons, Mary. A Prevailing Passion, Osborne Books Ltd . 1996
Whitefoot, Michelle. A Choral Chronicle - The History of the Worcester Festival Choral Society, (2020, self-published). ISBN 978-1-5272-7786-1
Wulstan Atkins; Edward Elgar; Sir Ivor Atkins (26 April 1984). The Elgar-Atkins friendship. David & Charles. ISBN 978-0-7153-8583-8

External links
Worcester Festival Choral Society web page
Worcester Cathedral
Three Choirs Festival
Gloucester Choral Society
Hereford Choral Society

English choirs
Culture in Worcester,_England
1861 establishments in England
Musical groups established in 1861
Organisations based in Worcestershire
Choral societies
British choirs